Jonathan Thomas Benson Jr. (born June 27, 1963) is an American retired stock car racing driver and the son of former Michigan modified driver John Benson Sr. Benson has raced across NASCAR's three national series (Cup, Busch, Truck), and his career highlights include the 1993 American Speed Association AC-Delco Challenge series championship, the 1995 NASCAR Busch Series championship, the 1996 NASCAR Winston Cup Series Rookie of the Year Award, and the 2008 NASCAR Craftsman Truck Series championship.

Benson, who began his NASCAR career in 1993, is the second of only three drivers that have won a championship in both the Busch Series and the Craftsman Truck Series, and the seventeenth of only thirty-six drivers to win a race in each of NASCAR's three national series.

Early career
Benson was born in Grand Rapids, Michigan. He graduated from Forest Hills Northern High School in 1981. He became a late model champion at Berlin Raceway in Marne, Michigan before joining the American Speed Association (ASA) in 1990. During Benson's rookie season in the ASA he captured one pole position, led 174 laps and scored eight top 10 finishes to blitz the competition for the ASA's Pat Schauer Rookie of the Year award. In 1991 Benson compiled 13 top 10s including four second-place finishes. Benson ranked fourth in the ASA AC-Delco Challenge Series in 1991. Benson later went on to win the 1993 ASA championship. During his time in the ASA series he drove the No. 21 Valvoline Chevrolet for Throop Motorsports.

In 1993, Benson made his Busch Series debut at Michigan International Speedway, driving the No. 41 Delco Remy Chevrolet for Ernie Irvan. He started 20th, but finished 40th after an early crash when he had flipped in the race. He ran three more races that season in the No. 74 Staff America Chevy for BACE Motorsports, qualifying third at Hickory Motor Speedway. His best finish was an eighteenth at Atlanta Motor Speedway.

Benson was hired to drive full-time for BACE in 1994. He won his first career race at the SplitFire 200 and finished sixth in points, winning Rookie of the Year honors. The following season, Benson won early in the season at Atlanta and Hickory and had nineteen top-tens, winning the championship. He also began running in the Truck Series in the No. 18 Performance Friction Chevrolet Silverado for Kurt Roehrig. In his first season, his best finish was a second at Indianapolis Raceway Park. The following season, he won the pole at North Wilkesboro Speedway.

1996–1999
In 1996, he moved up to the Winston Cup Series, a series Benson's father John Benson Sr. competed in for one race back in 1973.
He joined the No. 30 Pennzoil-sponsored team owned by Bahari Racing. He failed to qualify for one race at the Food City 500, but won the 1996 NASCAR Winston Cup Rookie of the Year title. He won one pole at Atlanta Motor Speedway. In August, he dominated the Brickyard 400 before a problem on the last pit stop ended his chances for victory. He ended the season with seven Top 10's and was 21st in points. He was invited to the 1996 International Race of Champions as the reigning Busch Series champion, and finished third in the final points, finishing in the Top 10 in all four races.

In 1997, Benson had eight Top 10's, but did not finish in the Top 5 once. He won his second career pole at Michigan and finished outside of the Top 10 by one point to Ken Schrader. At the end of the season, he announced he would be joining Roush Racing to run the brand-new No. 26 General Mills/Cheerios-sponsored Ford Taurus.

He missed the season opening Daytona 500, then finished 30th at the following race. He then had a streak of no finishes worse than ninth over the next five races and rose as high as tenth in points, before he finished 38th and 41st in the next two races. For the rest of the season, his best finish was ninth and he qualified no higher than second. He finished 20th in points. Benson had numerous crew chiefs in 1999. He had two Top 10 finishes and finished 28th in the final standings. After a long negotiation, he was able to buy out his contract and announced he would leave Roush.

2000–2003

At the start of the 2000 Winston Cup season, Benson found himself without a sponsor when he signed on to join Tyler Jet Motorsports to run the No. 10 car. The team showed up at Daytona Speedweeks with a white unsponsored Pontiac Grand Prix. Lycos.com signed on to be the team's sponsor for the year on the morning of the Daytona 500. During the race, Benson and crew chief James Ince gambled on a late pitstop when they took only two right side tires and fuel, to come out with the lead with 43 laps to go. He held off the field until a multi-car crash brought out the caution in the final 10 laps. On the restart with 4 laps to go, Benson was leading with Dale Jarrett and Jeff Burton right behind. Jarrett bumped Benson, sending him up the track going into turn one, then passed him for the win while Benson slid back in 12th. Benson finished sixth in the third race at the Las Vegas Motor Speedway, and was eleventh in points. At the next race at Atlanta, Benson did not qualify in first-round qualifying, and he missed the race after the second round was canceled. Benson finished second three weeks later.

At the Pepsi 400 in July, the Tyler Jet Motorsports car showed up at Daytona again with a white car. During the weekend before the race, the team removed the Lycos.com decals. Reports said that it was because Lycos never paid. Tyler Jet went sponsorless for the next 4 races before Aaron's came aboard right before the team shut down. During the sponsorless run the team was sold to MB2 Motorsports. In August, Valvoline announced they would not only sponsor the team but become part owner. Benson finished in thirteenth place in the final points.

Benson began his 2001 season with an engine failure that relegated him to 28th place, a few laps after the race's "Big One"  involving 19 cars took place. He had Top 10 finishes in each of the next four races, including a fourth-place run in the UAW-Daimler Chrysler 400, which allowed him to be a career high second in the points (tied with Sterling Marlin) following the spring Darlington Race. He finished third at Texas and Indianapolis. He did not win a points race, although he did win the non-points Winston Open at Charlotte from the pole after leader Ryan Newman in the No. 02 Alltel-sponsored Ford suffered a blown engine late in the race. Benson finished eleventh in the final points standings in 2001.

Benson started 2002 with a 10th-place finish in the Daytona 500 despite a crash early in the race. In May, Benson agreed to race in the Richmond Busch Series race for Marsh Racing in the No. 31 Whelen Engineering-sponsored Chevrolet. Benson was involved in a wreck in the early stages of the races and ended up with broken ribs and he missed three Cup races. At the Pepsi 400 in Daytona, he started sixth, and on the eighth lap he got together with Michael Waltrip. Benson ended up rebreaking his ribs which put him out of action for two more races. At Loudon, Benson started second, led 53 of 207 laps, and finished fourth. Benson tied a career-best second-place finish at the Martinsville Speedway, which he got twice in 2000. On November 3, he started 26th in the 43 car field at the Pop Secret Microwave Popcorn 400 at Rockingham. With 50 laps to go, he was running in fifth, and with 28 laps left he passed Mark Martin (who coincidentally had Valvoline as his sponsor for many years) for the lead. In the last 10 laps, other drivers were running out of gas, including his teammate Ken Schrader. However, Benson held off Martin by 0.26 seconds to win the race.

Benson was sixth in points after the first 4 races of 2003. Benson had Top 5 finishes at Dover and Homestead, and finished 24th in the points. Valvoline decided to release Benson in favor of rookie driver Scott Riggs after the season was over.

Busch and Trucks: 2004–2010

2004 started off with Benson signing on with Phoenix Racing to run the full 2004 Busch Series schedule. Benson won his first and only career Busch pole at Rockingham, but a rules violation relegated him to last place when the green flag dropped for the race. He was poised to win at Bristol in the spring until Benson was caught up in a late race incident between Kevin Harvick and David Stremme. Benson was also involved in a crash between the top 4 drivers at Nashville while racing for the win, and parted ways with Phoenix before the Richmond race. He also drove four races in Phoenix's No. 09 Cup ride, his best finish 27th at the Daytona 500.

Over the next few months Benson ran one Busch race for Matt Kenseth and Robbie and John Reiser. In August he was offered a ride in the Bill Davis Racing No. 23 truck in the Craftsman Truck Series, which was previously driven by Shelby Howard before he was released from the team. Benson had eight Top 10 finishes in thirteen races, finishing 25th in the 2004 series' points standings. Benson had ten Top 10 finishes in 25 races, and was 10th in the 2005 points standings. He ran four Busch races, one for FitzBradshaw Racing, and another for Smith Bros. Racing, finishing 18th at Nashville. He also had three Cup starts, two of them in the No. 00 Sara Lee Chevy for Michael Waltrip, and another at Atlanta in the No. 23 Dodge Intrepid for Bill Davis, finishing 28th.

He won his first Craftsman Truck Series race at the 2006 Con-way Freight 200 at the Michigan International Speedway. With the win, Benson became the seventeenth driver to win a race in all three of NASCAR's major series. He has also won a pole in each of the three series. He followed with a back-to-back win at the Toyota Tundra Milwaukee 200 at Milwaukee Mile. His third win of the season was at the Toyota Tundra 200 at Nashville Speedway. His fourth win of the season was at the Sylvania 200 at New Hampshire International Speedway.  Benson won his fifth race of the year at the Casino Arizona 150 at Phoenix International Raceway. Benson finished the 2006 season in second place, 127 behind Todd Bodine. He was named the series' Most Popular Driver for 2006.

For the 2007 season, Benson continued to drive in the No. 23 truck for Bill Davis Racing.  He finished the season in third place with four wins: the Toyota Tundra Milwaukee 200 at Milwaukee Mile, the O'Reilly 200 presented by Valvoline Maxlife at Bristol,  the Missouri/Illinois Dodge Dealers Ram Tough 200 at Gateway International Raceway, and the Ford 200 at Homestead-Miami Speedway. Benson was named the series' Most Popular Driver for the second year in row, becoming the first driver to repeat as award recipient. Benson also returned to NEXTEL Cup racing by driving the Wyler Racing No. 46 Toyota Camry in the 2007 Crown Royal Presents The Jim Stewart 400. He also returned to the Busch racing by driving the Phoenix Racing No. 1 Chevrolet Monte Carlo SS in the 2007 AT&T 250. Bill Davis also had Benson pull "double duty", driving the No. 23 truck and the No. 36 Toyota Camry in the Cup Series on the same weekend; he did so at the final two races of the year (Phoenix and Homestead-Miami).

Benson drove the No. 23 truck in the 2008 Craftsman Truck Series, winning the series championship in the last race of the season.  With the title, he became the second driver to win both the Busch Grand National Series and Craftsman Truck Series championships (Greg Biffle accomplished this in 2002).  In addition, to date he joined a list of only 6 drivers to ever win at least one championship in more than one of the three main title series (Bobby Labonte, Brad Keselowski, Kevin Harvick, and Kyle Busch are the others, and they have won championships in the second tier and Cup Series.) His first win of the season came at the Camping World RV Sales 200 at the Milwaukee Mile, the third consecutive race that Benson has won as Milwaukee Mile.  His second, third, and fourth wins came at the Built Ford Tough 225 at Kentucky Speedway, the Power Stroke Diesel 200 at O'Reilly Raceway Park, and the Toyota Tundra 200 at Nashville Superspeedway.  With this series of wins, he became the fifth driver in the Craftsman Truck Series to win three races in a row.  His fifth win of the year came at the Kroger 200 at Martinsville Speedway.  Benson was named the series' Most Popular Driver for the third year in row.

Also in 2008, after a deal for Jacques Villeneuve to drive the Bill Davis Racing No. 27 Toyota Camry fell through, it was announced that Benson and Mike Skinner would share driving duties for the No. 27. Benson failed to qualify in his first appearance in 2008 at the Kobalt Tools 500, which is also Benson's last attempt to run a Sprint Cup series race to date.

On November 6, 2008, Benson announced that he would not be returning to Bill Davis Racing after the 2008 season.  On December 8, 2008, Benson announced that he would be joining the Red Horse Racing team to drive the No. 1 Toyota Tundra in the 2009 season.  Benson's crew chief from the 2008 season, Trip Bruce, also joined the No. 1 team.  On June 8, 2009, it was announced that Red Horse Racing was having to suspend the No. 1 due to a lack of sponsorship after competing in eight races with four top 10 finishes.

On June 13, 2009 Benson was burned in a fiery crash in an ISMA Supermodifieds race at Berlin Raceway.  He was transported to Spectrum Health Butterworth Hospital with where he was hospitalized suffering from a broken collarbone, separated shoulder, three broken ribs, bruised lungs, a fractured wrist and third-degree burns on one elbow.  After undergoing two surgeries for the burns and a separated shoulder, Benson fully recovered.

For the 2010 season, Kyle Busch Motorsports intended to field a truck for Benson, but did not to secure the necessary sponsorship. Benson served as a mentor to Kyle Busch Motorsports' drivers Brian Ickler and Tayler Malsam. Benson drove for Team Gill Racing in the season opener at Daytona finishing 8th. He then drove for Billy Ballew Motorsports at Martinsville, Kansas, and Dover finishing in the top 10 in all 3 races including a pair of 5th-place finishes at Martinsville and Kansas. Benson's only race for Kyle Busch Motorsports came at Texas where he finished 10th. This was his final race in NASCAR.
 
Turn One Racing announced in 2011 that they intended to field a truck for Benson in 2012, but the deal fell through due to sponsorship issues.

Post-racing career
Benson currently works for the National Motorsports Appeals Panel. Benson is retired from NASCAR, but still races a supermodified for car owner Brad Lichty on the ISMA tour. He also served as the pace car driver for the 2021 SRX Series.

Motorsports career results

NASCAR
(key) (Bold – Pole position awarded by qualifying time. Italics – Pole position earned by points standings or practice time. * – Most laps led.)

Cup Series

Daytona 500

Xfinity Series

Camping World Truck Series

References

External links
 

Living people
1963 births
Sportspeople from Grand Rapids, Michigan
Racing drivers from Michigan
NASCAR drivers
NASCAR Xfinity Series champions
NASCAR Truck Series champions
International Race of Champions drivers
American Speed Association drivers
RFK Racing drivers
Kyle Busch Motorsports drivers
Michael Waltrip Racing drivers
Herzog Motorsports drivers